Ankush Hazra is an Indian actor, film producer, dancer and television personality in the Bengaliffilm industry. He debuted in 2010 with the film Kellafate. He has also appeared in Khiladi, Kanamachi, Ami Shudhu Cheyechi Tomay, Villain, Bibaho Obhijaan, Magic, and FIR. He launched the film production house Ankush Hazra Motion Pictures on 15 August 2022.

Acting career

2010-2020 
Hazra caught the attention of film director Pijus Saha who starred him in his romantic comedy film Kellafate of Banner-Prince Entertainment P4. This film was also produced by Saha. Hazra was paired opposite newcomer Rupashree.

Later, Hazra starred in the Bengali romantic drama film Idiot of Eskay Movies, directed by Rajib Biswas. He returned with his Bengali film Kanamachi. His next film was Ki Kore Toke Bolbo. Bibaho Obhijaan released on 21 June 2019.

2021-present 
He did two promotional short films named Illusion and Enter View for the film Magic. His film include the crime thriller film FIR. He then had a guest appearance in Kishmish.  His film Savings Account released on ZEE5.

Filmography

As actor

Television

Web series

Advertisement music videos

Awards and nominations

References

External links
 

Ankush Hazra Motion Pictures
Living people
Ankush Hazra Motion Pictures Films
Ankush Hazra Production
Male actors in Bengali cinema
Indian male film actors
21st-century Indian male actors
Bengali male actors
Bengali film producers
Year of birth missing (living people)